Zabol Qaleh (also Romanized as Zābol Qal‘eh; also known as Jānābād and Jahānābād) is a village in Qara Bashlu Rural District, Chapeshlu District, Dargaz County, Razavi Khorasan Province, Iran. At the 2006 census, its population was 60, in 14 families.

References 

Populated places in Dargaz County